"Forever Everyday" is a song recorded by American country music artist Lee Ann Womack.  It was released in October 2002 as the second single from the album Something Worth Leaving Behind.  The song reached #37 on the Billboard Hot Country Singles & Tracks chart.  The song was written by Devon O'Day and Kim Patton-Johnston.

Chart performance

References

2002 singles
2002 songs
Songs written by Devon O'Day
Songs written by Kim McLean
Song recordings produced by Mark Wright (record producer)
MCA Nashville Records singles